The Political Economy Research Institute (PERI) is an independent research unit at the University of Massachusetts Amherst. According to its mission statement, it "...promotes human and ecological well-being through our original research". PERI was established in 1998 by co-directors Robert Pollin and Gerald Epstein, both economists at the university. Funding for its foundation came from Pollin and his businessman father, Abe Pollin.

Toxic 100
PERI's Toxic 100 list includes one hundred United States companies ranked by the amount of greenhouse gases, air pollution and water pollution produced and the relative toxicity of the pollutants, as determined by PERI at the University of Massachusetts Amherst.

The Greenhouse 100 Index ranks companies by 2019 direct emissions from large sources. The top three companies are Vistra Energy, Duke Energy, and Southern Company, continuing a three-year period in which these were in the top three. They each released more than 85 million metric tons of -equivalent emissions. Together these three companies released 4 percent of all U.S. greenhouse gas emissions from all sources including non-energy sources.
Rounding out the top 10 in the Greenhouse 100 are Berkshire Hathaway, American Electric Power, Xcel Energy, Energy Capital Partners, NextEra Energy, and Exxon Mobil, with the U.S. government ranking 6th.  The Toxic 100 Air Polluters Index reports that the top 10 2019 companies in terms of total potential chronic human health risk are Boeing, LyondellBasell, Huntsman, Linde, BASF, Dow Inc., Celanese, Assa Abloy, Baker Hughes, and Eastman Chemical. The Toxic 100 Water Polluters Index ranks the pounds of toxics released into surface water or sent to water-treatment systems, adjusted for chemical toxicity. Northrop Grumman, Dow Inc., LyondellBasell, Celanese, and Canopus International top the Toxic 100 Water Index for 2019.

Toxic 100 air pollution scores are calculated by the formula:

Emissions x Toxicity x Population Exposure

Emissions are measured in millions of pounds.  Population exposure is based on the proximity of nearby residents, and factors such as prevailing winds and height of smokestacks.  Toxicity is calculated from the Risk-Screening Environmental Indicators by the Environmental Protection Agency.

References

External links
 Toxic 100 Air Polluters at the Political Economy Research Institute 

1998 establishments in Massachusetts
Educational institutions established in 1998
University of Massachusetts Amherst
Political economy